The College Republican National Committee (CRNC) is a national organization for College Republicans — college and university students who support the Republican Party of the United States. The organization is known as an active recruiting tool for the party and has produced many prominent republican and conservative activists and introduced more party members to the Republican party than any other organization in the nation.

The organizational structure of the College Republicans has changed significantly since its founding in 1892. Founded as an organization for the Republican National Committee, the College Republicans now operate as an independent 527 group. After the Young Republican National Federation was spun off from the College Republicans organization in 1972, the groups operate independently of one another.

History

Founding and early history

The College Republicans were founded as the American Republican College League on May 17, 1892 at the University of Michigan. The organization was spearheaded by law student James Francis Burke, who would later serve as a Congressman from Pennsylvania. The inaugural meeting was attended by over 1,000 students from across the country, from Stanford University in the west to Harvard University in the east. Contemporary politicians also attended the meeting, including Judge John M. Thurston, Senator Russell A. Alger, Congressman J. Sloat Fassett, Congressman W. E. Mason, John M. Langston, and Abraham Lincoln's successor in the Illinois State Legislature, A. J. Lester. Then-Governor of Ohio William McKinley gave a rousing keynote speech.

The College Republicans quickly pursued a strategy of sending college students to vote in their home districts and registering others to vote where they schooled to swing closely contested districts. This strategy was successfully implemented for the 1900 presidential election between William McKinley and William Jennings Bryan, helping win Bryan's home state of Nebraska for McKinley.

The College Republicans were financed, at least in part, by the Republican National Committee throughout much of its history. James Francis Burke received significant funding from the RNC to support the American Republican College League's founding and to maintain the organization's early offices in New York City and Chicago. By 1924, the organization was operating directly under the auspices of the RNC as the Associated University Republican Clubs.

The relative dominance of the Democratic party through the 1930s through the 1960s coincided with a precipitous drop in the membership and effectiveness of the College Republicans. In 1931, the College Republicans were absorbed as an arm of the Hoover campaign. For the next several years the organization operated alternately under the auspices of the "Republican National League," "Young Republican National Committee," and the "Division of Young Republican Activities." In 1935, the College Republicans were merged into the newly created Young Republican National Federation, encompassing both college students and young professionals. College Republican operations continued under the Young Republicans until the 1965 founding of the "College Republican National Committee."

Modern history
In 1967, Morton Blackwell, then a field representative for the CRNC to Kentucky, developed many of the principles now used by the College Republicans. As the college organizer supporting Louie Nunn's campaign for Governor of Kentucky, Blackwell organized approximately 5,000 college student volunteers who dropped 93,000 pieces of literature, posted 20,000 flyers, mailed 15,000 hand-addressed and signed postcards to friends of known student supporters of Nunn, and processed over 8,000 absentee ballots. On election day, Nunn became the first Republican governor of Kentucky in 20 years. The New York Times and Louie Nunn himself credited the efforts of Blackwell's volunteers.

In 1970, the Young Republican National Federation was permanently spun off from the College Republicans in 1970 to prevent counter-productive infighting among the two groups. In 1972 the Republican National Committee made the College Republican National Committee an auxiliary arm of the RNC.

In 1973, Karl Rove ran for chair of the College Republicans. He challenged the front-runner's delegates, throwing the national convention into disarray, after which both he and his opponent, Robert Edgeworth, claimed victory. The dispute was resolved when Rove was selected through the direct order of the chairman of the Republican National Committee, who at the time was George H W Bush.

By 1980, only 20 active College Republican chapters remained. By the US presidential election in 1980, that number had increased to 1,000 active clubs, helping Reagan win 98 of 105 mock elections and recruiting thousands of voters. This success led to $290,000 in financial assistance from the RNC, mainly to implement Jack Abramoff's field representative program. Abramoff's fund-raising efforts brought in an additional $1,160,000 during the next two years. By 1983, only 10% of the CRNC's budget came from the RNC.

Prompted by the 2002 Bipartisan Campaign Reform Act, the CRNC officially left the control of the RNC by reconstituting as a 527 group, allowing it to operate independently and raise unlimited amount of money for issue-advocacy work. As a 527 group, the organization is prohibited from coordinating directly with a particular campaign and its recent focus has turned towards developing volunteers and other support activities rather than outright campaigning. The shift has allowed the CRNC to vastly expand its fundraising efforts. During its first two years, the CRNC raised $17.3 million, most going to pay fundraising costs and other administrative costs, while leaving more than $2 million to expand the field representative program and to improve pay for the full-time positions.

The CRNC was criticized for its relationship with Response Dynamics, a Virginia-based direct mail company.  The relationship became an issue during the 2005 election for National Chairman, which was won by former CRNC Treasurer, Paul Gourley, whose signature was on the questionable fundraising letters.

Morgan Wilkins, a CRNC field representative for election 2006 was placed on probation by the CRNC after suggesting several controversial events might be held on the University of Michigan – Ann Arbor Campus, to that school's student newspaper, the Michigan Daily.  The events included, "Catch an Illegal Immigrant Day" and "Fun with Guns Day," where students were to shoot cardboard cutouts of prominent Democrats. This incident ultimately became a major news story on several national media outlets. Several sources, including the Michigan Daily incorrectly identified Ms. Wilkins as an employee of the Republican National Committee, rather than the CRNC, eliciting an outcry from Democratic National Committee Chairman, Howard Dean. In return, GOP Chairman Ken Mehlman condemned Wilkins' activities, as well as Governor Dean. Keith Olbermann named Wilkins his "Worst Person in the World." She was suspended for the incident, and later fired by the CRNC for later creating a Facebook group in which she promised to make out with individuals who signed up volunteers for get out the vote efforts.

In 2013 Alexandra Smith became the first elected female national chair of the College Republicans organization, and the first female national chair of the CRNC.

The College Republican National Committee is a member of the International Young Democrat Union.

Governance

College Republican National Committee
The College Republican National Committee (CRNC), is the national steering organization and oversight body for all 50 state federations, 1,500 campus chapters, and 250,000 College Republicans in the country. The CRNC National Chairman and his or her national leadership team, including an executive director, political director, finance director, comptroller, national field director, national treasurer, national secretary, and 4 regional vice-chairs, are elected at the bi-annual College Republican Convention and are assisted by a full-time office staff.

State federations
There are 46 CRNC-affiliated College Republican state federations, each administering the College Republican activities at the state level, and in the District of Columbia. The state federations of New York, Texas, Mississippi, and North Dakota, as well as the federation for U.S. territory of Puerto Rico, are independent from the CRNC. The state federation leadership team, which includes a state chairperson and other officers, serve as the primary link between local university chapters and the national College Republican National Committee. The state chairman serves as the representative for College Republicans when dealing with the state Republican Party, local media, and governmental entities. State federations are responsible for organizing and assisting local chapters with securing proper credentials, recruitment efforts, and campus voter canvasses. It is a state federation's responsibility to organize and implement activities for statewide campaigns. Like the national organization, state federations operate as non-profit associations that are not legally affiliated with the Republican Party.

Campus chapters
The college and university-based chapters of the College Republicans operate in a dual capacity as student clubs associated with a particular campus and as members of their state federation and the College Republican National Committee. Like the state federations and national committee, the campus chapters are affiliated with their local Republican Party, but are not official arms of that organization. The chapter chairperson and leadership team are responsible for maintaining the campus club's credentials and constitution, and representing the College Republicans when dealing with university administration, other student groups, and in the surrounding community. The campus chapter leadership team might include many members, with administrative responsibilities delegated to dormitory and Greek chapter chairpersons.

National leadership 
As of the 2021 National Convention the CRNC Board of Directors consists of:

 Chairman: Courtney Britt
 Co-Chairman: Matt Denaro
 Treasurer: Ely Osborne
 Secretary: Mackenzie Haddix 
 Midwest Regional Vice Chairman: Makenzie Jones
 Northeast Regional Vice Chairman: Cody Porter 
 South Regional Vice Chairman: Alex Schramkowski
 West Regional Vice Chairman: Nick Dokoozlian
 Comptroller:

Notable members

 Greg Abbott, 48th Governor of Texas
 Jack Abramoff, lobbyist
 Lee Atwater, Republican strategist 
 Matt Wiltshire, Guinness World Record holder for most political utilizations 
 Charles R. Black Jr., lobbyist and advisor to the McCain presidential campaign 
 Morton Blackwell, conservative activist 
 Hillary Clinton, former First Lady and Secretary of State was elected president of her College Republican chapter at Wellesley College, before switching parties due to the Vietnam War 
 Calvin Coolidge, 30th President of the United States
 Rick Davis, manager of the McCain campaign 
 Jim Gilmore, former Governor of Virginia  
 Patrick McHenry, North Carolina Congressman 
 Grover Norquist, Americans for Tax Reform president 
 Tom Pauken, Texas Republican Party Chairman Emeritus 
 Ralph E. Reed Jr., Christian Coalition executive director and political consultant 
 Karl Rove, Senior Advisor to President George W. Bush and a current contributor to Fox News, who served as executive director, and then national chairman, of the CRNC during his time in the organization
 Paul Ryan, 54th Speaker of the U.S. House of Representatives
 Rick Santorum, former U.S. Senator
 Roger Stone, political consultant 
 Roger Wicker, U.S. Senator 
 Joshua Workman, political consultant
Shawn Steel, Republican National Committeeman from California and former Chairman of the California Republican Party
Pete Wilson, 36th Governor of California
 Jeff Sessions , US Attorney General, U.S Senator. Began career as State Chairman of Alabama College Republicans

Activities

The CRNC organizes election-year field representative programs to send paid staffers to recruit and train students and chapters nationwide. Former national chair Jack Abramoff founded the field representative program in 1981. The program faltered during the 1980s and was revived during the late 1990s.

During the election season, campus chapters are responsible for organizing and implementing the campus canvas, running mock elections, managing the local get-out-the-vote efforts. At other times, the campus chapters will organize issue advocacy and lobbying efforts, welcome conservative guest speakers to campus, and organize social events and other recruitment activities.

During the election season, the CRNC focuses on developing a "mass based youth effort" directed toward electing Republican candidates. The CRNC often sends paid field representatives to individual campuses to assist in organizing the election efforts. Generally the hired field representative or chapter chair begins the school year with membership tables on campus for recruitment. Members use door-to-door canvassing and word of mouth to identify and register as many Republican voters among the student body as possible. These individuals are encouraged to vote through an absentee ballot and assist the candidates with election day Get Out The Vote efforts. Chapters occasionally run student mock elections and other special events as a means to gain positive earned media attention for a candidate.

Gallery

See also

 List of Chairpersons of the College Republicans
 Republican National Committee
 Young Republicans
 Teenage Republicans
 The New York Young Republican Club
 College Democrats of America
 College Democrats

References

External links
 College Republican National Committee – official website
 College Republican National Committee's IRS Filing Forms

 
Republican Party (United States) organizations
Student organizations established in 1892
527 organizations
Conservative organizations in the United States
Student wings of political parties in the United States
International Young Democrat Union
Youth wings of political parties in the United States